Alex Halberstadt is an American nonfiction writer and journalist.

He grew up in Moscow and in 1980 came to the United States, where he and his family settled in New York City. He attended Stuyvesant High School, Oberlin College and Columbia University.

Career

Halberstadt’s writing has appeared in The New York Times Magazine, The New Yorker, The New York Times Book Review, GQ, Travel + Leisure, Saveur, Food & Wine, New York Magazine, Grand Street, The Washington Post, Lucky Peach, The Paris Review, and elsewhere.

Young Heroes of the Soviet Union, his family memoir, was named a New York Times Book Review Editor's Choice and excerpted in The New Yorker. Writing in The New York Times, critic Jennifer Szalai called it "a loving and mournful account that’s also skeptical, surprising and often very funny," adding, "it’s the unexpected specificity of Halberstadt’s observations that ultimately make this memoir as lush and moving as it is.“

Halberstadt's critically acclaimed biography, Lonely Avenue: the Unlikely Life and Times of Doc Pomus, was named a New York Times Book Review Editor's Choice and a Best Book of 2007 by The Times (London). Ben Folds and Nick Hornby cited it as an inspiration for their collaborative album Lonely Avenue.

Halberstadt’s magazine writing was anthologized in Best Food Writing 2014 and Best American Food Writing 2018. In 2013 and 2014 he was nominated for a James Beard Award, and he appeared at the 2013 New Yorker Festival. He has received fellowships from The MacDowell Colony, Yaddo, and Art OMI at Ledig House. He teaches at New York University.

Bibliography

Books 

Young Heroes of the Soviet Union Random House. 2020.

Essays and reporting 

"October's Child: The Year I Left the Soviet Union". The New Yorker. April 5, 2020. 
"Unforeseen Calamities". MoMA Magazine. May 22, 2020.

References

External links
The New York Times review of Lonely Avenue
The Independent review of Lonely Avenue
The New York Times review of Young Heroes of the Soviet Union
An interview with Alex Halberstadt in The Paris Review

1970 births
American biographers
American male biographers
Living people
Oberlin College alumni
Soviet emigrants to the United States
The New Yorker people